The 1972 FA Charity Shield was contested between Manchester City and Aston Villa.

Normally, the Charity Shield would have been contested by the First Division champions and FA Cup holders, who were Derby County and Leeds United respectively, but both declined the chance to play in the Charity Shield. Instead, Manchester City, who had finished in fourth place in the First Division; and Aston Villa, who finished as Third Division champions accepted the invitation to play.

The match was played at Villa Park and Manchester City won 1–0, following a penalty from striker Francis Lee.

Match details

References

Comm
1972
Charity Shield 1972
Charity Shield 1972
Charity Shield 1972
Charity Shield